Cryptandra inconspicua is a flowering plant in the family Rhamnaceae and is endemic to the southwest of Western Australia. It is a small, spreading shrub with narrowly elliptic to egg-shaped leaves and head-like clusters of white, tube-shaped flowers.

Description
The edges of the leaves are rolled under, often concealing the densely hairy lower surface. The flowers are surrounded by 2 to 4 hairy, egg-shaped bracts. Flowering occurs from July to October.

Taxonomy and naming
Cryptandra inconspicua was first formally described in 2007 by Barbara Lynette Rye in the journal Nuytsia from specimens collected by William Blackall between Pingrup and Lake Grace in 1933. The specific epithet (inconspicua ) means "inconspicuous", referring to the size of the plant and its tiny leaves and flowers.

Distribution
This cryptandra has been recorded near Dumbleyung, between Pingrup and Lake Grace, and in the Fitzgerald River National Park in the Avon Wheatbelt, Esperance Plains and Mallee bioregions of south-western Western Australia.

Conservation status
Cryptandra inconspicua is listed as "Priority Two" by the Western Australian Government Department of Biodiversity, Conservation and Attractions, meaning that it is poorly known and from only one or a few locations.

References

inconspicua
Rosales of Australia
Flora of Western Australia
Plants described in 2007
Taxa named by Barbara Lynette Rye